James Keller (1900–1977) was Roman Catholic priest.

James Keller may also refer to:
 James E. Keller (1942–2014), American judge
 James Keller (Minnesota politician) (1907–1972), representative and senator

 Jim Keller, American rock guitarist
 Jim Keller (engineer), microprocessor engineer
 James keller, American voice actor